California's 7th State Assembly district is one of 80 California State Assembly districts. It is currently represented by Democrat Kevin McCarty of Sacramento.

District profile 
The district encompasses the northern two-thirds of the city of Sacramento and its northern and western suburbs. The California State Capitol is located in the district.

Sacramento County – 29.3%
 Antelope
 Elverta
 North Highlands – partial
 Rio Linda
 Sacramento – 67.6%

Yolo County – 24.3%
 West Sacramento

Election results from statewide races

List of Assembly Members 
Due to redistricting, the 7th district has been moved around different parts of the state. The current iteration resulted from the 2011 redistricting by the California Citizens Redistricting Commission.

Election results 1992 - present

2020

2018

2016

2014

2012

2010

2008

2006

2004

2002

2000

1998

1996

1994

1992

See also 
 California State Assembly
 California State Assembly districts
 Districts in California

References

External links 
 District map from the California Citizens Redistricting Commission

07
Government of Sacramento County, California
Government of Yolo County, California
Government of Sacramento, California
West Sacramento, California